Mungo McKay (born 22 January 1971) is an Australian actor.

Mungo McKay was born in Brisbane in 1971. McKay is the third son to Margaret and Desmond
and the second brother to Brett and David. Mungo studied at the Queensland Academy of Dramatic Arts and became a film actor. He is mostly known for his role as Marion in the 2003 Australian film Undead. He also played a minor role as the bartender in Disney's direct-to-video feature film, Inspector Gadget 2.

Filmography
Daybreakers (2010) .... Colin Briggs
 Through My Eyes (2004) .... Juror 2
 Inspector Gadget 2 (2003) .... Bartender
 Undead (2003) .... Marion
 BeastMaster .... Head Guard (The Island 1999 TV Episode )

External links
 
 Official Website

1971 births
Male actors from Brisbane
Living people